Bernd Klaus Wiesberger (born 8 October 1985) is an Austrian professional golfer who plays on the European Tour and the LIV Golf Invitational Series. He finished the 2019 season in third place on the Race to Dubai standings, his best finish to date.

In July 2015, when he won the Alstom Open de France, Wiesberger became the most successful Austrian golfer on the European Tour with three tour victories. He has since extended his record and is an eight-time winner on the European Tour. He also played in the 2021 Ryder Cup.

Amateur career
Wiesberger was born in Vienna. He won several amateur tournaments, including three Austrian Amateur Stroke Play Championships from 2004 to 2006, the Austrian Amateur Match Play Championship in 2004 and the Austrian Youths Championship in 2004 and 2005. He represented his country at the 2004 and 2006 Eisenhower Trophy. He turned professional in 2006.

Professional career
Wiesberger played on the Challenge Tour in 2007 and 2008. He earned his European Tour card for the 2009 season through qualifying school. He was unable to win enough money during his rookie season to retain his card and returned to the Challenge Tour. Wiesberger won two events, the Allianz Golf Open de Lyon and the Allianz Golf Open du Grand Toulouse, en route to a 5th-place finish on the Order of Merit, good enough for a European Tour card for 2011.

Wiesberger recorded four top-10 finishes in his return to the European Tour in 2011 including two runner up finishes. He finished 64th on the Order of Merit. Wiesberger claimed his maiden title on the European Tour in 2012 at the Ballantine's Championship, twice setting the course record and winning the championship by the margin of five strokes. The win moved him into the top 100 of the Official World Golf Ranking. In July 2012, Wiesberger won his second title of the year and of his European Tour career at the Lyoness Open, held in his home country of Austria. He started the final round four strokes back of Thorbjørn Olesen, but a round of 65 seven under par, including birdies at three of the last four holes secured a three stroke victory. He became only the second Austrian to win his home Open, after Markus Brier in 2006. After the victory he said: "It's the best day of my life so far. It seems like it went my way, especially the last two holes. I had such a great country and such great fans backing me. I'm very proud to be following in such big footsteps [as Brier]. I'm sure I'm not going to be the last home winner."

On 5 May 2013, Wiesberger won his sixth professional tournament and the second of his career in Asia, beating reigning Open Champion Ernie Els by a shot at the CIMB Niaga Indonesian Masters for his first win of the season.

In 2014, he lost a playoff at his home event, the Austrian Open. However, he earned enough world ranking points to place 60th in the world and become the first Austrian to play in the U.S. Open. Wiesberger had the last guaranteed position for entry and it was the event immediately after the Austrian Open. At the 2014 PGA Championship, Wiesberger was one off the lead of Rory McIlroy after 54 holes at Valhalla Golf Club and was paired with McIlroy in the final round of the championship. However, Wiesberger shot a three-over par round on the final day and finished in a tie for 15th.

In May 2015, Wiesberger lost in a three-man sudden-death playoff at the Dubai Duty Free Irish Open. He started the final round two strokes behind Søren Kjeldsen and despite shooting a 74, entered the playoff with Kjeldsen and Eddie Pepperell. Kjeldsen won on the first extra hole with a birdie. Wiesberger has lost all three sudden-death playoffs in his European Tour career. On 5 July Wiesberger would win his third event on the European Tour when he took the Alstom Open de France. Wiesberger took victory by three strokes over Englishmen James Morrison, Wiesberger had also started the round four strokes back of South African Jaco van Zyl but stormed back with final round 66. With this being his third win on tour, he became the most successful Austrian golfer in the history of the European Tour, moving ahead of Markus Brier, who had two wins; Martin Wiegele was the only other Austrian with a win.

Wiesberger claimed his fourth European Tour victory at the 2017 Shenzhen International. He won with a birdie at the first extra hole, in a sudden-death playoff, to defeat Tommy Fleetwood. Fleetwood had earlier shot a final round of 63 to come from eight strokes back and set the clubhouse lead. Wiesberger had to scramble for pars on the back nine and then almost holed his approach shot on the 72nd hole for the victory. In the playoff, Wiesberger found trouble from the tee, but hit his approach to within five feet for birdie to claim victory. His fourth victory came in his 200th event on the European Tour.

On 26 May 2019, Weisberger won his fifth European Tour title at the Made in Denmark at Himmerland Golf & Spa Resort. He won by shooting a final-round 66. On 14 July 2019, he won the Aberdeen Standard Investments Scottish Open at Renaissance Club in North Berwick, Scotland. He won in a playoff over Benjamin Hébert. On 13 October 2019, he won the Italian Open for his third victory of the European Tour season. This pushed him to first place in the season long Race to Dubai.

In May 2021, Wiesberger successfully defended his title at the Made in HimmerLand event. He shot a final-round 64 to win by five shots and advanced back to the top 50 in the Official World Golf Ranking. Four weeks later he followed that with a tied-for-fifth-place finish at the BMW International Open, to increase his chances of a selection to the 2021 European Ryder Cup team. In August, Wiesberger looked set to claim his ninth European Tour victory at the Omega European Masters. He had a one shot lead going down the final hole, however a double-bogey saw him drop into second place; one shot behind Rasmus Højgaard.

In September 2021, Wiesberger played on the European team in the 2021 Ryder Cup at Whistling Straits in Kohler, Wisconsin, becoming the first Austrian Ryder Cup player ever. The U.S. team won 19–9 and Wiesberger went 0–3–0 including a loss in his Sunday singles match against Brooks Koepka.

Amateur wins
1997 Austrian Boys Championship
2004 Austrian Amateur Match Play Championship, Austrian Amateur Stroke Play Championship
2005 Austrian Amateur Stroke Play Championship, Austrian Youths Championship
2006 Austrian Amateur Stroke Play Championship, Austrian Youths Championship

Professional wins (12)

European Tour wins (8)

1Co-sanctioned by the Asian Tour and the Korean Tour

European Tour playoff record (2–3)

Asian Tour wins (2)

1Co-sanctioned by the European Tour and the Korean Tour

Challenge Tour wins (2)

Other wins (1)
2012 Zurich Open

Results in major championships
Results not in chronological order in 2020.

CUT = missed the half-way cut
"T" indicates a tie for a place
NT = No tournament due to COVID-19 pandemic

Summary

Most consecutive cuts made – 7 (2018 Masters – 2021 Masters)
Longest streak of top-10s – 0

Results in The Players Championship

CUT = missed the half-way cut
"T" indicates a tie for a place
C = Cancelled after the first round due to the COVID-19 pandemic

Results in World Golf Championships
Results not in chronological order before 2015.

1Cancelled due to COVID-19 pandemic

QF, R16, R32, R64 = Round in which player lost in match play
NT = no tournament
"T" = tied

Team appearances
Amateur
European Boys' Team Championship (representing Austria): 2002, 2003
Eisenhower Trophy (representing Austria): 2004, 2006
European Amateur Team Championship (representing Austria): 2005
Jacques Léglise Trophy (representing Continental Europe): 2003
European Youth's Team Championship (representing Austria): 2006

Professional
World Cup (representing Austria): 2013, 2016
Royal Trophy (representing Europe): 2013 (winners)
EurAsia Cup (representing Europe): 2016 (winners), 2018 (winners)
Ryder Cup (representing Europe): 2021

See also
2008 European Tour Qualifying School graduates
2010 Challenge Tour graduates
List of golfers with most European Tour wins

References

External links

Austrian male golfers
European Tour golfers
LIV Golf players
Olympic golfers of Austria
Golfers at the 2016 Summer Olympics
Sportspeople from Vienna
People from Oberwart
Sportspeople from Burgenland
1985 births
Living people
21st-century Austrian people